Barbara Lynch is a musician/singer/songwriter from Toronto, Ontario, Canada. Her first album, Goodbye and Goodluck, was released by Duke Street Records in 1996. Lynch self-produced her second album, In the Nickelodeon. It was released in 2008 under GDA Records and then in 2009 become a part of the new Cowboy Junkies' record label, Latent Recordings, distributed by MapleMusic.

Albums

Goodbye and Goodluck (1996 - Duke Street Records) 

1. Take It A Day at a Time
2. Nobody Thought That It Would
3. Suicide
4. Flowers Outside
5. Puppet Girl
6. When You Kiss Me
7. There Wasn't Enough For You
8. Storybook
9. This House
10. Lullaby
11. The Best That You Can

Produced by David Travers-Smith. All songs written by Barbara Lynch except #10 by Lynch/Traditional. Musicians on the album: Barbara Lynch, Rich Greenspoon, David Travers-Smith, Rich Pell, Christopher Plock, Uli Bohnet, Oliver Shroer, George Koller, Roman Borys.

In the Nickelodeon (2008 - GDA Records) 

1. We Go Back a Long Long Way
2. Someday You'll Dance
3. Will You Ever Care For Me
4. Go Easy On Him
5. New Orleans Is Drownin'
6. Nickelodeon
7. As Soon As I Make Enough Money
8. Wagon Lament
9. Doomsday Clock
10. Take Me For A Ride
11. Missing You
12. Daddy Ain't Dead
13. Saturday Nights

Self-produced with assistance of Eric Brown and John Timmins. All songs written by Barbara Lynch except #6 and #9 by Lynch/Traditional. Engineered by Eric Brown at GDA Studios. Musicians on the album include Eric Brown, Christopher Plock, John Timmins, Katherine Wheatley and John Wojewoda.

External links 
 Official Myspace page
 Official Blog on Latent Recordings Website
 Official Page at GDA Records
 Goodbye and Goodluck review
 [ Barbara Lynch on AllMusicGuide.com]

Notes 

Year of birth missing (living people)
Living people
Canadian women rock singers
Canadian singer-songwriters
Musicians from Toronto